Penitentiary II is a 1982 American blaxploitation drama film directed by Jamaa Fanaka. Released on April 2, 1982, the film is the sequel to 1979's Penitentiary. It was followed by another sequel, Penitentiary III, which was released in August 1987.

Plot
Martel "Too Sweet" Gordone earned his parole from jail by winning a prison boxing tournament. All Too Sweet wants to do is start a peaceful life, but a condition of his release is that he work for a boxing promoter. Too Sweet has no interest in boxing and wants to live with his sister and her husband who support his desire to start over. However, when an old enemy from prison, Half Dead, escapes and kills his girlfriend, Too Sweet changes his plans and returns to the ring.

Cast
 Leon Isaac Kennedy as Martel "Too Sweet" Gordone
 Eugenia Wright as Clarisse
 Glynn Turman as Charles Johnson
 Mr. T as Himself
 Archie Moore as Himself 
 Ernie Hudson as "Half-Dead" Johnson
 Peggy Blow as Ellen Johnson
 Sephton Moody as Charles Johnson Jr.
 Donovan Womack as Jesse "The Bull" Amos
 Malik Carter as Hezzikia "Seldom Seems" Jackson
 Stan Kamber as Sam Cunningham
 Cepheus Jaxon as "Do Dirty"
 Marvin Jones as "Simp"
 Ebony Wright as "Sugar"
 Renn Woods as Nikki
 Lyrica Garrett as Evelyn
 Gerald Berns as Beau Flynn, Light Heavyweight Champion
 Tony Cox as "Midget"
 Wilbur "Hi-Fi" White as "Hi-Fi"
 Warren Bryant as "Ms. Thing"
 Alfred Mariorenzi as The Warden
 Dennis Lipscomb as Announcer
 Hawthorne James as 1st Referee
 Allan Graf as 2nd Referee

References

External links
 
 

American prison films
American sequel films
1982 films
1980s sports drama films
1980s prison films
American boxing films
Blaxploitation films
1982 drama films
American sports drama films
Metro-Goldwyn-Mayer films
United Artists films
Films directed by Jamaa Fanaka
1980s English-language films
1980s American films